Vatica brunigii is a species of plant in the family Dipterocarpaceae. It is a tree found in Sumatra and Borneo.

It is an endangered species threatened by habitat loss. Vatica brunigii has been threatened since 1997. This tree has some medicinal properties and lives in coastal areas, forests and dry ridges.

References

brunigii
Trees of Sumatra
Trees of Borneo
Endangered flora of Asia
Taxonomy articles created by Polbot